Rhythms in Arabic music are rich and very diverse, as they cover a huge region and peoples from Northern Africa to Western Asia. Rhymes are mainly analysed by means of rhythmic units called awzan and iqa'at.

Wazn and Iqa'

A rhythmic pattern or cycle in Arabic music  is called a "wazn" (plural أوزان / awzān), literally a "measure", also called darb, mizan in Arabic language, also has other names like usul  as is in Ottoman classical music) for example. A Wazn is performed on the goblet drum (tarabuka), frame drum (riqq or tar), and kettle drums (naqqarat).

A wazn is only used in musical genres with a fixed rhythmic-temporal organization including recurring measures, motifs, and meter or pulse. It consists of two or more regularly recurring time segments, each time segment consisting of at least two beats (naqarāt, plural of naqrah). There are approximately one hundred different cycles used in the repertoire of Arabic music, many of them shared with other regional music, also found in some South European styles like Spanish music. They are recorded and remembered through onomatopoetic syllables and the written symbols O and I. Wazn may be as large as 176 units of time.

Iqa' ( / īqā‘; plural إيقاعات / īqā‘āt) are rhythmic modes or patterns in Arabic music. There are reputed to be over 100 iqa'at, but many of them have fallen out of fashion and are rarely if ever used in performance. The greatest variety of iqa'at (ranging from two to 48 beats) are used in the muwashshah.
Shaabi.
Tarab.
Dabke.
Khaliji.
Maghrebi.

Some examples of Iqa'at 
Andālusi (أندلسي مغربي ) 
Aadāni ( عدني يمني )  
Aadāniyāt ( عدنيات اليمن )
Aarabi Aām ( عربي عام )
Aarabi Khāliji (عربي خليجي)
Ardah āl Bahriyah (عرضه البحريه)
Ardah āl Nājādiyah (عرضه النجديه)
Aayalah ( عيالة )
Aaysāwi ( عيساوي )
A'raj ( اعرج )
Aghar Aqṣāq ( آغر اقصاق )
Alaji ( الآجي ) 
Aqṣāq ( اقصاق ) 
Aqsāq Ifrangi ( A'raj Ifrangi ) 
Aqṣāq Samā'i ( اقصاق سماعي ) 
Āshuri Iraqi ( عاشوري عراقي ) 
Āshuri Khāliji ( عاشوري خليجي ) 
Āskāri ( اسكري ) 
Ātbah ( عتبه )  
Awfar ( اوفر ) 
'Awīs ( عويص ) 
Ayūb (ايوب) 
Bāduwi Wāhrāni ( بدوي واهراني - الجزائر ) 
Baladī ( بلدي مصري ) 
Bāmbi Masri ( بامبي مصري ) 
Bānāti ( بناتي ) 
Bāndari Khāliji ( بنداري خليجي )
Bāsta Khāliji ( بستا خليجي ) 
Bāsta Masri ( بستا مصري ) 
Bāwādi ( بوداي ) 
Bāyu ( بايو ) 
Bāyun ( بايون )   
Billīq Shāmī ( بيلاق شامي ) 
Dābkah Shami (Dabkeh) ( دبكة شامي ) 
Dābkah Iraqī Kurdistan ( دبكة عراقي - كردي)  
Dāhifah Yāmāni (دحيفه)
Dālāaunah Shami ( دلعونا شامي ) 
Darb Fath Masri ( ضرب فتح مصري ) 
Darbuka Tabla Masria ( طبلة مصرية ) 
Dārij (دارج) 
Dāsaah Yāmāni (دسعه يمني)
Dawr El-Kabīr ( آهات مصري - دور الكبير ) 
Dawr Hindī ( دور هندي ); also called Nim Nawākht 
Dawr Kabīr Halabī (دور الكبير - حلبي)  
Dazah ( دزة )  
Dharafāt 
Diziri ( دزيري جزائري )     
Dusāri ( دوسري خليجي عام )  
Dusāri Khalijī ( دوسري خليجي سعودي) 
Du-Yak 
Fākhit ( فاخت ) 
Fākhitah ( فاخيتة ) 
Fākhitah 'Arabī ( فاخيتة عربية ) 
Fālāhi Masri ( مصري فلاحي)
Far' 
Fāzāni ( فزاني )  
Fikra ( فكرة ) 
Fikratī ( فكرتي  )
Frankajīn ( فرنكجين ) 
Fuks ( فوكس ) 
Gharbi - Western ( غربي ) 
Ghitah ( غيتة ) 
Hādi Bārwāli ( حادي بروالي )
Hājaa ( هاجع خليجي ) 
Harbi ( حاربي خليجي ) 
Hāwī 
Hāywa ( هايوا )
Hazaj 'Arabī (  هزاج عربي   ) 
Ibrahimi ( يبراحيمي )
Ibrahimi Falastinī ( يبراحيمي فلسطيني ) 
Ibrahimi Urdunī ( يبراحيمي اردني ) 
Jānubi (عراقي جانوبي)
Jānubi ( عربي جانوبي ) 
Jānubi Yamani ( جانوبي يمنـي ) 
Jānubi Soudani ( جانوبي سوداني ) 
Jirk ( زرك ) 
Jubi ( جوبي ) 
Jurjīnah ( جرجينه ) 
Kārātshi ( كرتشي ) 
Katākuftī ( كتكفتي ) 
Katākuftī Shamī ( كتكفتي شامي ) 
Khābāyti (خبيتي) 
Khafīf 'Arabī ( خفيف عربي)
Khashabah ( خشابة ) 
Khūsh Rank ( خوش رنك ) 
Khuwizaani ( خويزعاني ) 
Khuwizaani Khalijī ( خويزعاني خليجي ) 
Khuwizaani Iraqī ( خويزعاني عراقي ) 
Kukubāni (كوكباني يمني)
Lāf ( لف )  
Lāf Iraki ( لف عراقي ) 
Lāf Masri ( لف مصري ) 
Lāf Shamī ( لف شامي ) 
Lamā (Raqsān) (  لما رقصان) 
Lāywa ( ليوا ) 
Lāywa Aaumanī ( ليوا عماني ) 
Lāywa Iraqī ( ليوا عراقي )  
Maalāyah ( معلاية ) 
Māhrāqānāt Masri ( محراغنات مصري ) 
Mālfūf ( ملفوف ) 
Maqsūm Masri ( مقسوم مصري )  
Maqsūm Saraei Masri (مقسوم صرعي مصري) 
Maṣmūdi Kabīr ( مصمودي كبير مصري ) 
Maṣmūdi Saghīr ( مصمودي صغير مصري) 
Masrahi ( مصراحي ) 
Mazdakah (مزداكة) 
Mizmar Khāliji (مزمار خليجي)
Mizmar Saīdi ( مزمار صعيدي )
Mudawwar ( مدوّر ) 
Muhajjar ( محجّر ) 
Mukhālif ( موخليف ) 
Mukhammas ( مخمّس ) 
Murabba' ( مربّع ) 
Murubaa' ( مروبع )  
Noqur ( نقر موريتاني ) 
Naqazi ( نقزي ) 
Naqsh ( نقش )
Naqsh in 17/4
Naqsh in 18/4
Naqsh in 21/4
Naqsh in 36/4
Naqsh in 40/4
Naqsh in 52/4
Nawākht ( نواخت )
Nawākht Hindī ( نواخت هندي ) 
Nīm Oyūn Havāsī ( نيم ايون هواسي ) 
Nīm Dawr ( نيم دور ) 
Nīm Hazaj ( نيم هزج ) 
Nīm Rawān ( نيم روان ) 
Nīm Warash ( نيم وراش ) 
Nubi Masri (نوبي مصري) 
Qadri ( قادري ) 
Qātiqūfti 
Ray Ālāuwi (راي الاوي) 
Rahaj (رهج) 
Ramal Halabī ( رامل حلبي سوريا) 
Rawān (روان)
Rubaa (روبع)
Rubi (روبي)
Rumba Khāliji ( رومبا خليجي ) 
Rumba Masri ( رومبا مصري ) 
Rumba Saauwdī ( رومبا سعودي ) 
Rumba Yāmānī ( رومبا يمني ) 
Saaydi Masri Classic ( صعيدي مصري كلاسيك ) 
Saaydi Masri Modern ( صعيدي مصري مودرن ) 
Saaydi Masri Shaabi ( صعيدي مصري شعبي ) 
Saauwt ( صعوط ) 
Sādah Dūyek ( ساده دو يك ) 
Sādāyah 
Samā'ī Ṭā'er ( سماعي طائر ) 
Samā'ī Dārij ( سماعي دارج ) 
Samā'ī Thaqīl ( سماعي ثقيل )  
Sāmri Iraq( سامري - العراق ) 
Sāmri Khāliji( سمري-الخليجي ) 
Shaabi Khāliji ( شعبي خليجي ) 
Shaabi Maghrebi ( شعبي مغربي ) 
Shaabi Masri ( شعبي مصري ) 
Shaabi Halabī Suriyī ( شعبي حلبي سوريا ) 
Shakshakah Masriah ( شكشكة مصرية ) 
Shanbar Halabī ( شنبر حلبي - سوريا ) 
Shanbar Kabīr ( شنبر كبير ) 
Sharh ( شرح )  
Sharh Saaudī ( شرح سعودي ) 
Sharh Yāmānī ( شرح يمني ) 
Sawt Khāyāli ( صوط خيالي ) 
Sawt Shāmi ( صوط شامي ) 
Shiftātāli ( شفتتالي ) 
Sinkīn Samā'ī ( سنكين سماعي ) 
Sittatu 'Ashar ( ستة عشر ) 
Sudāsi ( سداسي ) 
Sūfiyān ( سفيان  ) 
Sumbāti Masri ( صومباتي مصري ) 
Suwāhli ( سواحلي ) 
Suwqa ( سوقا ) 
Tāmburah ( تمبورة ) 
Egyptian Tānurah ( التانورة - شعبي مصري ) 
Taras 
Torreq Al Sufīa ( طرق الصوفية )
Ṭurrah ( طرّة ) 
Uryantal ( اورينتال ) 
Wāhda (واحدة - لبناني)
Wāhda (واحدة - مصري) 
Wāhda kābirah ( واحدة كبيرة ) 
Wāhda Sāghirah ( واحدة صغيرة ) 
Wāhda Khāfifah (واحدة خفيفة)
Wāhda Mukallafa ( واحدة مكلّفة - مصري) 
Warash 
Warshān 'Arabī Khalijī ( ورشان عربي خليجي ) 
Yānbaawi ( ينبعوي ) 
Yūruk Samā'ī ( يورك سماعي ); also called Samā'i Dārij ( سماعي دارج ) 
Zāfāh Masria ( زفة مصرية ) 
Zāfāh Maghribi ( زفة مغربي ) 
Zāfāh Shamia ( زفة شامية) 
Zāfāh Khaliji ( زفة خليجي ) 
Zāyāni ( زاياني ) 
zār Masri ( زار مصري ) 
Zīr-Afkand  
Zāhaj Arābi (زهج عربي )

See also
Dumbek rhythms
Usul
Sa'idi
Khaliji Rhythms
Levantin Music
Music of Egypt

References

Cited sources
Habib Hassan Touma (1996). The Music of the Arabs, trans. Laurie Schwartz. Portland, Oregon: Amadeus Press. .

External links
Arabic Rhythms page from Maqam World

Arabic music
Middle Eastern music
North African music
Arabic music theory